The ARAS or Lithuanian Police Anti-terrorist Operations Unit ARAS is the police tactical unit of the Lithuanian Police Force and was established in 1991. At first, ARAS's main purpose was to suppress organized crime groups that were widely operating in Lithuania in 1990s. In addition, they handled riot suppression, peace keeping, and escort. In December 2004 the unit was admitted into the ATLAS Network of police tactical units of the European Union countries.

Structure 
ARAS consists of a:
 Command,
 Special Team,
 Explosive Search and Neutralization Division,
 Information, analysis and negotiation Division,
 2 divisions, one of them located in Klaipėda.
The unit also has specialized reconnaissance, negotiation, sniper, climber and diver groups that are necessary to carry out the main functions ascribed to the unit.

Functions 
The main functions of ARAS are to:
 organize, manage and implement special antiterrorist operations inside Lithuania;
 rescue hostages and detain dangerous armed criminals under extreme or high danger circumstances;
 search for and neutralize improvised explosive devices and military explosives, used for terrorist or criminal purposes;
 under their competence participate while performing various operative actions, detaining persons, suspected to have performed or planning to commit a crime;
 collect and analyze information related to terrorist threats, cooperate with professional institutions of other countries in this sphere;
 participate in organizing and implementing plans and programs for antiterrorist measures, and other legal acts establishing terrorism prevention.

Equipment and training 
ARAS is provided with modern arms and equipment for successful work. There are modern weapons with special sights, night vision equipment, thermo visors, equipment for explosives search, modern equipment for divers, special armour-plated vests, shields and helmets among them.

Nevertheless, all weapons are worthless without competent people. Currently the nucleus of the unit is made up of highly qualified combatants, who have acquired physical and psychological training and are prepared for working under extreme circumstances. Much experience was gained when the officers participated in several courses for special unit response to critical situations organized by the US State Department, which were included in the international program for the war against terrorism. During these exercises they showed good preparation, and received a high evaluation from the organizers of the courses. Officers from the unit participated in many other courses organized not only in the US, but also by law enforcement institutions of other countries.

Equipment 
ARAS operators use a variety of modern weapons, including SIG Sauer P226, Heckler & Koch MP5, G36, SIG SG 551, SIG MCX, PGM Ultima Ratio, PGM Hécate II, AWM-F.

Training 
Candidates are selected on the basis of "Delta Force" program criteria. Candidates have their biography's thoroughly checked, the age requirement is not younger than 18 and no older than 30 years, priority is given to non-smokers, 5 years of work experience in any other police branch would be advantage. Those who make it through this barrier have to grapple with the psychological and intelligence tests and have to pass the physical preparation check, especially endurance and emotional stability. Only 2-3 men a year make the cut into this elite group.

References

External links 
 Official website
 Lithuanian police website

1991 establishments in Lithuania
ATLAS Network
Police tactical units
Law enforcement in Lithuania